William Donne may refer to:

 William Donne (cricketer) (1875–1934), English cricketer
 William Donne (priest) (1845–1914), British clergyman
 William Bodham Donne (1807–1882), English journalist

See also
 William Done (1815–1895), English organist